The Royal Saxon State Railways designated four-coupled, Atlantic (4-4-2) express locomotives as Class X  and the Deutsche Reichsbahn subsequently grouped these locomotives into DRG Class 14.2 in 1925.

History 
In 1900 the Sächsische Maschinenfabrik engineering works built the first two express locomotives of the new four-coupled, Atlantics with a four-cylinder compound engine. One of the locomotives was displayed at the Paris World Exhibition in 1900 and was awarded the Grand Prix.

The Royal Saxon State Railways took over the two prize-winning locomotives and procured another 13 up to 1903 that differed from the prototypes, particularly in terms of the diameter of the carrying axles. They were the largest and most powerful locomotives in Saxony to that point. The X V was employed on express train duties on the plains where its riding qualities and economy were impressive.

In 1920 the Deutsche Reichsbahn took over all 15 engines and gave them the new numbers 14 201–215 in 1925. They were retired by 1926.

Technical features 
The locomotives had a boiler with a Belpaire firebox, which was located between the frame sides. Two injectors provided the boiler feedwater.

The steam engine was designed as a de Glehn four-cylinder compound. The outer high-pressure cylinders drove the second coupled axle, whilst the inside low-pressure cylinders drove the first. The motion for the engine was a Walschaerts valve gear on the outer cylinders and a Joy valve gear on the inner ones.

Braking for locomotive and train was provided by a Westinghouse compressed-air brake. On the two prototypes the air pump was on the right, on the remaining locomotives it was installed on the left hand side.

The coupled axles were fixed to the frame. The leading bogie was an Erfurt design, the trailing axle was an Adams axle.

The locomotives were coupled with Saxon tenders of classes sä 2'2' T 18, sä 2'2' T 19.5 and sä 2'2' T 21.

Service 
The locomotives were only in express train service on the Leipzig–Dresden railway for a few years before the four-coupled engines proved too underpowered for the steadily climbing train loads. The X V was then deployed mainly on the passenger trains from Dresden to Bodenbach, Leipzig and Zittau until its retirement.

See also 
Royal Saxon State Railways
List of Saxon locomotives and railbuses

Sources 

 
 
 
 

4-4-2 locomotives
10 V
Sächsische Maschinenfabrik locomotives
Railway locomotives introduced in 1900
Standard gauge locomotives of Germany
2′B1 n4v locomotives
Passenger locomotives